Landscapers is a true crime dark comedy-drama drama miniseries created and written by Ed Sinclair, and directed by Will Sharpe. The series is based on the true story of the 1998 murders of William and Patricia Wycherley and stars Olivia Colman and David Thewlis as Susan and Christopher Edwards, the couple behind the murders, as their decade-old crimes are uncovered in 2012.

Premise
Inspired by real events, Landscapers tells the story of mild-mannered Susan and her husband, and how they came to kill Susan's parents and bury them in the back garden of their Mansfield home, in a crime that remained undiscovered for over a decade.

Cast
 Main
 Olivia Colman as Susan Edwards
 David Thewlis as Christopher Edwards
 Kate O'Flynn as DC Emma Lancing
 Dipo Ola as Douglas Hylton
 Daniel Rigby as DCI Tony Collier
 Samuel Anderson as DC Paul Wilkie
 Felicity Montagu as Patricia Wycherley
 David Hayman as William Wycherley

Episodes

Production
In December 2019, HBO and Sky announced they had given a series order to Landscapers, a true-crime miniseries written by Ed Sinclair and originally intended to be directed and executive produced by Alexander Payne, with Olivia Colman attached to star; Sinclair had created and wrote the series with Colman in mind for the part of Susan Edwards.

In October 2020, Alexander Payne exited the project due to scheduling conflicts and was replaced by Will Sharpe. David Thewlis was cast as Christopher Edwards in March 2021. Principal photography for the series began in March 2021 in Mansfield, Nottinghamshire.

The series features a flashback scene; although both Colman and Thewlis are intended to be much younger in the scene, no visual effects or specific makeup were used, with Thewlis commenting "We just put wigs on."

Both Colman and Thewlis stated that they did not doubt the culpability of the Edwards in the murder, but that series was intended to create empathy and an understanding for the couple, with Thewlis stating "what we’re asking the audience to decide is not whether they're guilty, because they clearly are, but whether they deserve sympathy" and Colman stating "you do find yourself going, 'God, I wonder, had I had that set of circumstances, what would I do? They’re gentle, meek people. What on earth made them do it?"

Reception
The series received positive reviews upon its release, particularly for the two leads performances. On Rotten Tomatoes, it has an overall approval rating of 98% with an average score of 8.10/10 based on 46 reviews. The site's critical consensus reads: "Landscapers layers enigmatic style onto an already unbelievable true story with varying results, but Olivia Colman and David Thewlis ground the absurdity with outstanding performances". On Metacritic, which uses a weighted average, the series has a score of 79 based on 22 reviews indicating 'Generally favourable reviews'.

In the United Kingdom, the series averaged 1.52 million viewers, aired on SkyAtlantic.

References

External links
 

2021 American television series debuts
2021 American television series endings
2020s American drama television series
2021 British television series debuts
2021 British television series endings
2020s British drama television series
2020s American drama television miniseries
2020s British television miniseries
HBO original programming
Sky Atlantic original programming
English-language television shows
Mansfield